Burlington is a historic plantation house located near Barboursville, Orange County, Virginia. The main house was built in 1851–1852, and is a two-story, three-bay, "T"-shaped residence with a shallow hipped roof in the Greek Revival style. It has a traditional I-house plan with an ell addition. The front facade features a portico with six Greek Ionic order columns with a plain entablature.  It has a Jeffersonian Chinese lattice balcony cantilevered on the second floor.  The exterior and interior detailing is derived almost entirely from Asher Benjamin's The Practical House Carpenter, 1830 edition.  The house was built by James Barbour Newman, nephew of Governor James Barbour.

It was listed on the National Register of Historic Places in 1994.

References

Plantation houses in Virginia
Houses on the National Register of Historic Places in Virginia
Greek Revival houses in Virginia
Houses completed in 1852
Houses in Orange County, Virginia
National Register of Historic Places in Orange County, Virginia
1852 establishments in Virginia